Gaoling District is one of 11 urban districts of the prefecture-level city of Xi'an, the capital of Shaanxi Province, Northwest China. The most densely populated of the ten districts of Xi'an, the district borders the prefecture-level city of Xianyang to the northwest, Lintong District to the east, Baqiao District to the south, and Weiyang District to the southwest.

Administrative divisions
As 2020, Gaoling District is divided to 7 subdistricts.
Subdistricts

References

External links
 

Districts of Xi'an